Baluch Imer Mohammad (also Romanized as Balūch  Īmer Moḩammad) is a village in Bagheli-ye Marama Rural District, in the Central District of Gonbad-e Qabus County, Golestan Province, Iran. At the 2006 census, its population was 578, in 133 families.

References 

Populated places in Gonbad-e Kavus County